D. J. Leahy was a hurler from County Kerry. He Played with the Kerry county and Causeway teams along with his brother Maurice. He scored a goal from a long-range free to give Kerry the impetus to drive on and win there 1993 Munster Senior Hurling Championship win over Waterford. He Won 5 County Championships with Causeway in 1979, 1980, 1981, 1982, 1987. He also won a Railway Cup with Munster in 1985. He won All Ireland B titles in 1983 and 1985 with Kerry.

References
 Profile of Maurice and D.J. Leahy
http://i40.tinypic.com/2hrkeh0.png

Living people
Causeway hurlers
Kerry inter-county hurlers
Munster inter-provincial hurlers
Year of birth missing (living people)